Nurse is a 1969 Indian Malayalam-language film, directed by Thikkurissy Sukumaran Nair and produced by P. Subramaniam. The film stars Jayabharathi, Thikkurissy Sukumaran Nair, Muthukulam Raghavan Pillai and Bahadoor. The film had musical score by M. B. Sreenivasan.

Cast
Jayabharathi
Thikkurissy Sukumaran Nair
Muthukulam Raghavan Pillai
Bahadoor
Kottarakkara Sreedharan Nair
Pankajavalli
Pushpalatha
Ramakrishna
S. P. Pillai
K. V. Shanthi

Soundtrack
The music was composed by MB Sreenivasan with lyrics by Sreekumaran Thampi.

References

External links
 

1969 films
1960s Malayalam-language films
Films scored by M. B. Sreenivasan